Antonella Falcione (born 28 January 1991 in Carlos Paz) is a professional squash player who represents the Argentina. She reached a career-high world ranking of World No. 65 in July 2014.

References

External links 
 
 
 

1991 births
Living people
Argentine female squash players
South American Games silver medalists for Brazil
South American Games bronze medalists for Brazil
South American Games medalists in squash
Competitors at the 2018 South American Games
Squash players at the 2019 Pan American Games
Squash players at the 2015 Pan American Games
Pan American Games competitors for Argentina
21st-century Argentine women